The bay breeze is a cocktail which has a Cape Codder as its base, with the addition of pineapple juice. The drink is also sometimes called a downeaster, Hawaiian sea breeze, or a Paul Joseph.  This cocktail is similar to the sea breeze, an IBA Official Cocktail with grapefruit juice (rather than pineapple).

Ingredients
The following ingredients are based on the IBA measures for a Sea Breeze when issued in parts.

 2 parts vodka
 6 parts cranberry juice
 1.5 part pineapple juice

Build all ingredients in a highball glass filled with ice. Garnish with lime wedge.

See also

 Sea breeze (cocktail)
 List of cocktails

References 

Cocktails with vodka
Cocktails with cranberry juice
Cocktails with pineapple juice
Three-ingredient cocktails